George Anthony Daney (September 2, 1946 – February 15, 1990) was an American football guard. He played college football at the University of Texas at El Paso. He was drafted in the first round of the joint 1968 AFL/NFL draft by the Kansas City Chiefs.

College career
Daney committed to Texas Western College of the University of Texas (Texas Western) out of high school. His sophomore year he helped lead the Miners to a Sun Bowl victory over cross-state team TCU. His senior the school changed its name to its current name, the University of Texas at El Paso, frequently shortened to UTEP. That season, he helped lead the Miners to another Sun Bowl victory over Ole Miss.

Professional career
He was drafted by the Kansas City Chiefs with the 22nd overall pick in the first round of the joint 1968 AFL/NFL draft. He won Super Bowl IV in 1970. He spent his entire seven year career with the Chiefs playing for Hall of Fame coach Hank Stram every season of his career.

Post football career
Following his retirement from football, Daney worked in advertising.

Death
He died from carbon monoxide poisoning on February 15, 1990. His wife found him dead in their garage. He had been working on his car.

References

1946 births
1990 deaths
People from Washington, Pennsylvania
American football offensive guards
Players of American football from Pennsylvania
Sportspeople from the Pittsburgh metropolitan area
UTEP Miners football players
Kansas City Chiefs players
Deaths from carbon monoxide poisoning
American Football League players